Nóra Nagy-Bujdosó (born November 18, 1985) is a Hungarian basketball player for VBW CEKK Ceglèd and the Hungarian national team.

She participated at the EuroBasket Women 2017.

References

1985 births
Living people
Hungarian women's basketball players
Basketball players from Budapest
Small forwards